Viz Darreh (also Romanized as Vīz Darreh) is a village in Yaft Rural District, Moradlu District, Meshgin Shahr County, Ardabil Province, Iran. At the 2006 census, its population was 19, in 6 families.

References 

Towns and villages in Meshgin Shahr County